Wu Weihua (born September 1956) is a Chinese plant cell physiologist, molecular biologist and politician who is the current chairman of the Jiusan Society (2017–present), and a vice chairman of the Standing Committee of the National People's Congress Standing Committees (2018–present). He is also a member of the Chinese Academy of Sciences.

Biography 
On 7 December 2020, pursuant to Executive Order 13936, the US Department of the Treasury imposed sanctions on all 14 Vice Chairperson of the National People's Congress, including Wu, for "undermining Hong Kong's autonomy and restricting the freedom of expression or assembly."

References 

1956 births
Living people
20th-century Chinese botanists
21st-century Chinese botanists
Chairperson and vice chairpersons of the Standing Committee of the 13th National People's Congress
Academic staff of China Agricultural University
Chinese molecular biologists
Individuals sanctioned by the United States under the Hong Kong Autonomy Act
Members of the Chinese Academy of Sciences
Members of the Jiusan Society
Plant physiologists
Politicians from Linfen
Rutgers University alumni
Shanxi University alumni